Colpoides is a genus of beetles in the family Carabidae, containing the following species:

 Colpoides formosanus Jedlicka, 1940
 Colpoides hauseri Jedlicka, 1931
 Colpoides kulti Jedlicka, 1952
 Colpoides pecirkai Jedlicka, 1931

References

Platyninae